João Paulo Matias de Azevedo (born 13 March 1984) is a Portuguese sport shooter who has won medals at individual senior level at the World Championships and European Championships.

References

External links
 

1984 births
Living people
People from Vila do Conde
Trap and double trap shooters
Portuguese male sport shooters
Shooters at the 2020 Summer Olympics
Sportspeople from Porto District
20th-century Portuguese people
21st-century Portuguese people